Grace Mumbi Ngugi is a Kenyan lawyer and a Judge of the High Court of Kenya. She is serving in the Anti-corruption and Economic Crimes Division of the Court.

She is a long-term advocate of human rights in Kenya. She has been involved in advocacy work for the rights of women and children, as well as the housing rights of the urban poor. She has also been a prominent activist for the rights of persons with the condition in Kenya, and co-founded the Albinism Foundation for East Africa.

Justice Ngugi holds a Bachelor of Laws Degree (LLB) from the University of Nairobi and a Master of Laws (LLM) in Commercial and Corporate Law from the London School of Economics, University of London.

Early life and education 
She was born in Banana Hill, Kiambu County. She was born with albinism, to a family of 11 siblings. Ngugi attended Thindigua Primary School, which she passed with 35 out 36 points. She was subsequently admitted to Ngandu Girls High School in Nyeri. Later, she pursued law degrees at the University of Nairobi and the London School of Economics.

Career 
Mumbi was appointed as a High Court judge in 2011. She has served in various capacities in the public and private sectors.

Ngugi was awarded the 2018 CB Madan Award in annual ceremony organized by The Platform magazine and Strathmore Law School.

Awards 
Ngugi was given the Global Jurist Of The Year Award in February 21 by the Northwestern University Pritzker School of Law in Chicago. She has also received:

 2013 International Commission of Jurists-Kenya (ICJ-K) Jurist of the Year Award
 Brand Kenya Ambassador Award in 2013
 The Law Society of Kenya Distinguished Service Award 2017
 The C.B. Madan Award 2018 by The Platform Magazine
 The Transparency International Judicial Integrity Award 2019.

References

Judiciary of Kenya
Living people
Kenyan women judges
Kenyan women lawyers
Year of birth missing (living people)
People from Kiambu County
University of Nairobi alumni
Alumni of the London School of Economics